Twickenham is a town in the Borough of Richmond upon Thames, in west London.

Twickenham may also refer to:

 the former Municipal Borough of Twickenham, which merged into the present London Borough of Richmond upon Thames in 1965
 Twickenham Film Studios
 Twickenham Stadium, a rugby union stadium in Twickenham, England
 Twickenham (UK Parliament constituency)
 Huntsville, Alabama, US, by original name 
 Twickenham Historic District, in Huntsville
 Twickenham, Oregon, US, an unincorporated community in Wheeler County
 , a Second World War minesweeper